Miguel Ángel Sanabria (born November 11, 1964) is a retired football (soccer) midfielder from Paraguay. He played professional football for clubs like Club Olimpia in Paraguay, and also had a spell in Bolivia, playing for Club Bolívar.

Sanabria made his international debut for the Paraguay national football team on July 10, 1991 in a Copa América match against Venezuela (5-0 win), substituting Felipe Peralta in the 76th minute. He obtained a total number of three international caps, scoring no goals for the national side.

External links

1964 births
Living people
Paraguayan footballers
Paraguay international footballers
Paraguayan expatriate footballers
Association football midfielders
Expatriate footballers in Bolivia
Club Olimpia footballers
1991 Copa América players
Club Bolívar players
Sportspeople from Luque
La Paz F.C. managers